Cherian Philip (born 21 November 1953) is an Indian politician and is the Coordinator of Nava Kerala Action Plan, which is an initiative of the Pinarayi Vijayan-led Government of Kerala. He was the Secretary of Kerala Pradesh Congress Committee while A. K. Antony was in presidency. He was a prominent youth and student leader of the Indian National Congress in seventies and eighties. A political historian of Kerala and India, he has authored several books. He worked as a consultant for Kairali TV and People TV (now Kairali News). He was the Chairman of Kerala Tourism Development Corporation (KTDC) and founder president of Kerala Deshiya Vedhi - a social organisation. He returned to Congress(I) on October 28, 2021.

Early life
Cherian Philip was born in Aratupuzha, Chengannur, as the elder son of K. C. Philip, Kadavana sub family of Pakalomattom Ayrookuzhiyil, a prominent Saint Thomas Christian family of Kerala.

He studied at St. Joseph's Higher Secondary School, Thiruvananthapuram, Mar Ivanios College, Thiruvananthapuram, University College Thiruvananthapuram and Government Law College, Thiruvananthapuram.

Political career
Cherian Philip entered politics through Kerala Students Union (KSU) in 1967 as school unit President while Oommen Chandy was its president. He was elected as the Secretary of the Kerala University Union and Senate Member of Kerala University in 1974. He became the General Secretary of KSU in 1975 and its President in 1979–80. From 1980 onwards, he was the Vice President of Kerala Pradesh Youth Congress and from 1982–89, was the General Secretary of Youth Congress. During the period 1984–89, he was the member of Indian Youth Congress National Council. Then became the Secretary of Kerala Pradesh Congress Committee (KPCC). In 1992, he constituted a new social organization named Kerala Desiya Vedhi in his Presidency. Until 2001, he was in the Indian National Congress and later quit Congress. He contested against Oommen Chandy. as a protest against power monopoly in the Congress. His demand was not to give tickets to MLA's completed two terms or 10 years. But the Congress leadership denied it.

In the 1991 Kerala Legislative Assembly election, he contested as Congress candidate but lost to T. K. Ramakrishnan of the Communist Party of India (Marxist) in Kottayam constituency by a mere 2682 votes.

In the 2001 Kerala Legislative Assembly election, he contested as an Independent candidate supported by LDF against Oommen Chandy at Puthuppally constituency.

In the 2006 Kerala Legislative Assembly election, he contested against Joseph M. Puthussery in Kallooppara constituency and in 2011 contested against K. Muraleedharan in Vattiyoorkavu constituency.

He anchored and produced social critical weekly programme Cherian Philip Pratikarikkunnu on Kairali TV for 10 years from 2001–06 and 2011–16 which ran about 500 episodes.

He was the Chairman of Kerala Tourism Development Corporation (KTDC). International Marina (Kochi), Kerala House (Chennai), GV Raja Convention Centre (Kovalam), Beach Camp (Bekal), Golden Peak Resorts (Ponmudi) and 14 Tamarind Hotel during his tenure.

He worked as the consultant for Kairali TV and People TV (now Kairali News). He is the author of seven books: Kaal Noottandu (Political History of Kerala), Swathanthryathinu Shesham (Political History of India), Vidyabhyasa Viplavam  (an educational study), Azhimathiyude Kara (a social criticism), Gulfile Keralam (a Lifestyle study), Nethrunira (Life sketches of 200 Kerala politicians), Rashtriya Vijnjanam (political theory), Idanazhikalil (Autobiography).

Cherian Philip received several awards from the Government of Kerala and social organizations for his books and TV programmes. H was editor of Kalashala fortnightly official organ of KSU (1974–80). Was the political correspondent of Veekshanam daily (1976–82). He was the editor of Socialist Youth Monthly, the official organ of Youth Congress from 1980–87 and also the convenor of YuvaPratibha, a cultural organization. He attended World Youth Festivals in Moscow (1984), Korea (1989). He visited more than 30 countries in the world. He returned to Congress(I) on October 28, 2021.

References

External links
Ayrookuzhiyil Kadavana Family
Cherian Philip's blog
, The Hindu, 6 April 2001
CHERIAN PHILIP: Affidavits filed by Candidate 
 , The Hindu 12 January 2003
KTDC.com
Site of Kerala Tourism Department, Govt of Kerala, India
KTDC properties less affected by the slow down: Cherian Philip , 21 January 2009
VS inaugurates Onam celebrations, The Hindu.
TV channels call the bluff of Kerala politicians
"Cherian Philip lashes out at administrative service officers", The Hindu, 20 February 2010
 Ak Antony is my political mentor: Cherian Philip in.com
 Retain Upper Sanatorium: Cherian Philip, The Hindu, 29 November 2007
 Janata Dal demands resignation of Cherian Philip, Asianet, 23 October 2009
 KTDC chief calls for probe into purchase of boat, The Times of India, 24 October 2009

1954 births
Living people
Politicians from Thiruvananthapuram
Malayali politicians
Pakalomattam family
People from Alappuzha district